Duncan Beattie (born July 7, 1929) was the Progressive Conservative Member of the Canadian House of Commons for the riding of Hamilton Mountain in Ontario from 1972 to 1974 and again from 1979 to 1980.

He served as a team manager for Hamilton Steelers in the National Soccer League, and Eastern Canada Professional Soccer League from 1960 til 1964.

References

1929 births
Living people
Members of the House of Commons of Canada from Ontario
Politicians from Hamilton, Ontario
Progressive Conservative Party of Canada MPs